C. silvestrii may refer to:
 Campodea silvestrii, a diplura insect species
 Camponotus silvestrii, a carpenter ant species
 Catalpa silvestrii, (Pamp. & Bonati) S.Y.Hu, a flowering plant species in the genus Catalpa
 Ceratitis silvestrii, Bezzi, a fruit fly species in the genus Ceratitis
 Cyclops silvestrii, Brian, 1927, a  freshwater copepod species in the genus Cyclops

See also
 Silvestrii (disambiguation)